The men's 400 metre freestyle competition of the swimming events at the 1975 Pan American Games took place on 21 October. The last Pan American Games champion was Jim McConica of the United States.

This race consisted of eight lengths of the pool, with all eight being in the freestyle stroke.

Results
All times are in minutes and seconds.

Heats

Final 
The final was held on October 21.

References

Swimming at the 1975 Pan American Games